Indian Academy Group of Institutions was established by the Indian Academy Education Trust, and is located on Hennur Main Road of Bangalore in the state of Karnataka. The group of educational institutions comprises an autonomous degree college, a school of management studies, a pre-university college, a nursing school and an evening college. The Trust was founded and is chaired by Dr. Thummala Somasekhar, a professor and scientist who has held academic and research positions at Bangalore University, India, University of Southern California, Los Angeles, USA, University of Illinois, Chicago, USA and Ohio State University, Columbus, Ohio, USA, before returning to Bangalore. Coming into existence in 1994.

The Trust provides financial assistance to those in need through merit and means scholarships and fee concessions. Charity, community service and civic participation are treated as Institutional Social Responsibility and human values are nurtured through informal education.

Group of Institutions
Indian Academy Degree College - Autonomous (IADCA), the flagship higher educational institution of the group, is a permanently affiliated college of Bangalore University with 2(f) and 12(B) status accorded by University Grants Commission of India. The College has been re-accredited by National Assessment and Accreditation Council (NAAC) at Grade 'A++' with a CGPA of 3.61 in Cycle-3. IADC-A was accorded autonomous status with effect from the academic year 2022-23.
Indian Academy Pre-University College - IAPUC
Indian Academy College of Nursing - IACN
Indian Academy School of Nursing - IASN
IA School of Management Studies - IASMS (Formerly known as Indian Academy School of Management Studies) 
Indian Academy Evening College - IAEC

References 

Colleges in Bangalore
1994 establishments in Karnataka
Educational institutions established in 1994